Alliance Party may refer to the following political parties:

 Alliance Party of Kenya
 Alliance (New Zealand political party)
 Alliance Party of Northern Ireland
 Alliance Party (Fiji) 
 Alliance Party (Malaysia)
 Alliance Party (Panama) 
 Alliance Party (Sweden)
 Alliance Party (United States)

See also

Alliance (disambiguation)
National Alliance (disambiguation)
New Alliance Party (disambiguation)